Nishant Kumar (born 1985) is an English stand-up comedian and television presenter. He became known as the host of satirical comedy The Mash Report, now known as Late Night Mash. He has also presented BBC Radio 4 Extra's topical comedy show Newsjack, the Comedy Central series Joel & Nish vs The World, the BBC Radio 4 programme The News Quiz and Hello America on Quibi.

Early life and education

Kumar was born in Wandsworth in 1985 and raised in Croydon, south London. He attended St Olave's Grammar School in Orpington before reading English with history at Durham University as a member of Grey College. He is of Indian descent: his parents are from Kerala. His father chose the surname Kumar for the family when he emigrated to the UK.

Career
Kumar performed with Tom Neenan as a double act, Gentlemen of Leisure, having met while students at the University of Durham and performed in the Durham Revue.

He has been performing as a solo stand-up performer in shows since 2013. He also held a regular guest spot on Josh Widdicombe's Radio X show between 2013 and 2015, where he presented the feature "Nishipedia".

Kumar has also taken part in a number of topical news programmes:

 In February 2015, he was announced as the host for the twelfth series of the BBC Radio 4 Extra series Newsjack.
 He has been a regular co-host and nude correspondent  of The Bugle podcast since October 2016.  
 His series Spotlight Tonight with Nish Kumar first aired on BBC Radio 4 in March 2017.
 He was a guest on the BBC comedy show Frankie Boyle's New World Order in June 2017
 In 2020, he hosted the first of 3 series of The News Quiz, with Angela Barnes and Andy Zaltzman hosting the other two series. Since then, Zaltzman became the permanent host, therefore replacing Miles Jupp.

He has performed solo Edinburgh shows since 2012: 
 2012: 'Who Is Nish Kumar?'
 2013: 'Nish Kumar Is a Comedian'  
 2014: "Ruminations on the Nature of Subjectivity".
 2015: "Long word... Long word... Blah Blah Blah... I'm so clever" at The Pleasance Theatre, which continued as a UK tour running from October to December 2015. The show was nominated for an Edinburgh Comedy Award.
 2016: "Actions Speak Louder Than Words, Unless You Shout the Words Real Loud", which received a number of favourable reviews. A joke from the show was featured in The Daily Telegraphs list of the 37 funniest jokes from the Edinburgh Fringe. This show continued as a national tour.
As a live performer, Kumar has appeared at a number of festivals and events, including the Melbourne International Comedy Festival, New Zealand Comedy Festival, Leicester Comedy Festival and the comedy tent at Latitude Music Festival. In 2017, he competed in series 5 of Taskmaster with Bob Mortimer, Sally Phillips, Aisling Bea and Mark Watson. The same year, Kumar completed a six-part travel series for Netflix with fellow comedian Joel Dommett, titled Joel & Nish vs The World. In 2018 he appeared on Netflix's Comedians of the World.

He has also appeared as a guest on Have I Got News for You, Mock the Week, Virtually Famous, 8 Out of 10 Cats, Alan Davies: As Yet Untitled, Hypothetical, The Big Fat Quiz, Russell Howard's Stand Up Central, Sweat the Small Stuff, QI, Live from the BBC, The Alternative Comedy Experience and is a frequent guest on The Bugle.

In February 2019, it was announced he would be appearing in a new Sky One sport show, Comedians Watching Football With Friends.

In December 2019, Kumar was booed off stage at a Christmas charity lunch event for the Lord's Taverners. The performance, for which Kumar was not paid, included political jokes on Boris Johnson, Jacob Rees-Mogg, Theresa May and the ongoing Brexit process. Following the event, the Lord's Taverners released a statement emphasising the apolitical nature of the organisation and expressing that they did not support the behaviour of some members of the crowd, which included booing, heckling and the throwing of a bread roll. In response to the event, Kumar told The Guardian: "I'm sort of amazed by how fascinated people are by the whole thing. It's not the first time I've been booed off stage [...] I consider it the life of being a comedian – they have a right to boo me."

Kumar hosted the Quibi topical comedy series Hello America, which ran from August 2020 until the channel's closure in December that year.

Kumar hosted the topical BBC comedy show The Mash Report from its launch in 2017 to its cancellation in 2021. It was speculated that the series was dropped due to its perceived left-leaning political position, although the BBC made no official statement on this. Kumar expressed frustration over the lack of clarity, saying "They need to make a definitive statement that it was not a political decision. Because what precedent does that set otherwise?" Rights to the show were picked up by the television channel Dave, who began broadcasting new episodes as Late Night Mash, with Kumar and the main cast returning, in September 2021. In October 2021, Kumar revealed that he was stepping down from Mash after five seasons, four on the BBC and one on Dave, to "spend more time with [his] emotional problems."

Personal life 
Kumar is in a relationship with fellow comedian Amy Annette, whom he met in 2010. He was raised Hindu and still identifies as Hindu.

References

External links

 
 
 

1985 births
Living people
English male television actors
English male film actors
English radio presenters
English male comedians
Male actors from London
British male actors of Indian descent
English people of Indian descent
People from Wandsworth
People educated at St Olave's Grammar School
Alumni of Grey College, Durham
21st-century English male actors
21st-century English comedians
People from Croydon